Ayu is a minor and endangered Plateau language of southern Kaduna State, Middle Belt Nigeria. Its subsequent classification is uncertain, but it may be one of the Ninzic languages (Blench 2008). It is not being passed on to many children.

Ethnologue (22nd ed.) lists Ayu locations as Agamati, Amantu, Ambel, Anka, Arau, Digel, Gwade, Ikwa, Kongon, and Tayu villages in Sanga, Nigeria.

References

Plateau languages
Languages of Nigeria
Endangered unclassified languages
Unclassified languages of Africa
Endangered Niger–Congo languages